Van Kerckhoven is a surname. Notable people with the surname include:

Anne-Mie van Kerckhoven (born 1951), Belgian artist
Nico Van Kerckhoven (born 1970), Belgian footballer
Patrick van Kerckhoven (born 1970), Dutch DJ
Peter Frans Van Kerckhoven (1818–1857), Flemish writer
Willem Frans Van Kerckhoven (1853–1892), Belgian soldier, explorer, colonial administrator

Surnames of Dutch origin